Inspector-General of Intelligence and Security may refer to:

Inspector-General of Intelligence and Security (Australia)
Inspector-General of Intelligence and Security (New Zealand)

Intelligence and Security